Joseph Arnold Hodgkins (1 February 1886 – 24 March 1944) was an Australian rules footballer who played with Melbourne in the Victorian Football League (VFL).

Notes

External links 

1886 births
Australian rules footballers from Victoria (Australia)
Melbourne Football Club players
1944 deaths